Microchaetina petiolata is a species of bristle fly in the family Tachinidae. It is found in North America.

Distribution
Canada, United States, Mexico.

References

Dexiinae
Diptera of North America
Taxa named by Charles Henry Tyler Townsend
Insects described in 1919